Walter Joseph "Wally" Reinecker (April 12, 1890 – April 18, 1957), born Walter Joseph Smith, was a Major League Baseball third baseman who played for the Baltimore Terrapins of the Federal League in .

External links

1890 births
1957 deaths
Major League Baseball third basemen
Baltimore Terrapins players
Baseball players from Pittsburgh